94th Infantry Regiment may refer to:

 94th Regiment of Foot (disambiguation), several units of the British Army
 94th Russell's Infantry, a unit of the British Indian Army
 94th Infantry Regiment (France)
 94th Infantry Regiment (German Empire), part of the IV Reserve Corps

Union Army (American Civil War):
 94th Illinois Infantry Regiment
 94th Indiana Infantry Regiment
 94th Ohio Infantry